Archdiocese of Hanoi is a Roman Catholic metropolitan archdiocese of Vietnam. It is one of the earliest in the history of the Catholic Church in Vietnam.

The creation of the diocese in present form was declared 24 November 1960. It covers an area of 7,000 km2 and has been led by Archbishop Joseph Vũ Văn Thiên since November 2018.

Suffragans 
The suffragan dioceses are:
 Diocese of Bắc Ninh
 Diocese of Bùi Chu
 Diocese of Hải Phòng
 Diocese of Thái Bình
 Diocese of Lạng Sơn & Cao Bằng
 Diocese of Hưng Hóa
 Diocese of Phát Diệm
 Diocese of Thanh Hóa
 Diocese of Vinh
 Diocese of Hà Tĩnh

Cathedral
Saint Joseph Cathedral in Hanoi has been assigned as the cathedral of the archdiocese. The cathedral was built in 1886 in neo-Gothic style. It holds several masses throughout the day and is usually crowded on weekends and religious holidays. Christmas holiday in 2004 attracted more than 4,000 visitors to the cathedral.

Current state 
By 2004, the Archdiocese of Hanoi had about 282,886 believers (5.3% of the population), 59 priests and 132 parishes.

The Archdiocese of Hanoi is a "sister" diocese of Roman Catholic Diocese of Orange County (USA) since 2008.

The young Catholics from the Archdiocese of Hanoi and Archdiocese of Ho Chi Minh City formed in 2006 an organization for helping children in rural and underdeveloped areas of Vietnam.

Among the three major churches of Hanoi are Saint Joseph Cathedral, Cua Bac Church and Hàm Long Church.

In November 2006, the Cua Bac Catholic Church in Hanoi became the venue of joint worship service of the Vietnamese Catholics and Protestants with participation of the United States president George W. Bush, who was on an official visit to Vietnam. Cua Bac Church (Northern Gate Church) has regular sermons and services in the English language and is often visited by expats and tourists.

In December 2007, thousands of Vietnamese Catholics marched in procession to the former apostolic nunciature in Hanoi (confiscated by the communist government in 1959) and prayed there twice aiming to return the property to the local Church. Despite their initial promise to return the nunciature building to the Roman Catholic community, the authorities changed their position in September 2008 and decided to demolish the building to create a public park. The protests of the Catholic community were not taken into account.

It is purported that Archbishop Emeritus Ngo Quang Kiet was pressured to retire by government officials. Archbishop Kiet denied this, saying his retirement was due to stress and insomnia. His retirement was accepted by Pope Benedict XVI on 10 May 2010 and he was succeeded by Coadjutor Archbishop Nguyên Van Nhon.

On 17 November 2018, 58-year-old Joseph Vũ Văn Thiên, Bishop of Hải Phòng, was appointed Archbishop of Hanoi by Pope Francis. Pope Francis accepted Cardinal Nguyễn Văn Nhơn's resignation on 17 November 2018.

Ordinaries

Vicariate Apostolic of Tonking
François Pallu (29 July 1658 - 15 April 1680), Appointed Vicar Apostolic of Fo-Kien

Vicariate Apostolic of Western Tonking
Name changed 24 July 1678
Jacques de Bourges (25 Nov 1679 - 9 August 1714 Died)
Edme Bélot (9 Aug 1714, Succeeded - 2 January 1717 Died)
François-Gabriel Guisain (3 Dec 1718 - 17 November 1723 Died)
Louis Néez (8 Oct 1738 - 19 October 1764 Died)
Bertrand Reydellet (19 Oct 1764, Succeeded - 27 July 1780 Died)
Jean Davoust (18 Jul 1780, Succeeded - 17 August 1789 Died)
Jacques-Benjamin Longer (17 Aug 1789, Succeeded - 8 February 1831 Died)
Joseph-Marie-Pélagie Havard (8 Feb 1831, Succeeded - 5 July 1838 Died)
Pierre Dumoulin-Borie (30 Jan 1836 - 24 November 1838 Died)
Pierre-André Retord (24 Nov 1838 - 22 October 1858 Died)
Charles-Hubert Jeantet (22 Oct 1858, Succeeded - 24 July 1866 Died)
Joseph-Simon Theurel (24 Jul 1866, Succeeded - 3 November 1868 Died)
Paul-François Puginier (3 Nov 1868, Succeeded - 25 April 1892 Died)
Pierre-Jean-Marie Gendreau (25 Apr 1892, Succeeded - 3 December 1924)

Vicariate Apostolic of Hà Nôi
Name changed 3 December 1924
Pierre-Jean-Marie Gendreau (3 December 1924 - 7 February 1935 Died)
François Chaize (7 Feb 1935, Succeeded - 23 February 1949 Died)
Cardinal Joseph-Marie Trịnh Như Khuê (18 Apr 1950 - 24 November 1960)

Archdiocese of Hanoi
Elevated 24 November 1960
 Joseph-Marie Trịnh Như Khuê (24 November 1960 - 27 November 1978)
 Joseph-Marie Trịnh Văn Căn (27 November 1978 - 18 May 1990) (Coadjutor Archbishop: 5 February 1963 - 27 November 1978)
 Paul Joseph Pham Ðình Tụng (23 March 1994 - 19 February 2005) (Apostolic Administrator: 5 July 1990 - 23 March 1994)
 Joseph Ngô Quang Kiệt (19 February 2005 - 13 May 2010) (Apostolic Administrator: 26 April 2003 - 19 February 2005)
 Pierre Nguyễn Văn Nhơn (13 May 2010 - 17 November 2018) (Coadjutor Archbishop: 22 April 2010 - 13 May 2010)
 Joseph Vũ Văn Thiên (17 November 2018 – current)

Auxiliary Bishops 
 François-Xavier Nguyễn Văn Sang (24 March 1981 - 3 December 1990), appointed Bishop of Thái Bình
 Paul Lê Đắc Trọng (23 March 1994 - 21 January 2006)
 Lorence Chu Văn Minh (15 October 2008 - 26 January 2019)

References

Roman Catholic Archdiocese
Roman Catholic dioceses in Vietnam
Christian organizations established in 1960
Roman Catholic dioceses and prelatures established in the 20th century
Roman Catholic ecclesiastical provinces in Vietnam
 
1960 establishments in North Vietnam